Wittia sororcula, the orange footman, is a moth of the family Erebidae. The species was first described by Johann Siegfried Hufnagel in 1766. It is found in Europe, Anatolia and further east across the Palearctic to southern Siberia and the Amur basin to China.

Technical description and variation

Forewing with the costa strongly convex and therefore the apical portion of the forewing considerably broader than in the forms of the luterella group. Head, thorax, end of abdomen and the forewing bright golden yellow, the hindwing of male but little paler; in the female both wings slightly paler orange yellow. In contradistinction to lutarella, the costal area of the hindwing above and beneath is never black.

Transfer from Eilema to Wittia
The orange footman was previously placed in the genus Eilema, but was transferred to the genus Wittia by Vladimir Viktorovitch Dubatolov in 2011.

Subspecies
Wittia sororcula sororcula
Wittia sororcula orientis (Daniel, 1954)

Biology
The moth flies from April to June depending on the location. Larva blackish, with two yellow dorsal stripes with red dots and white spots. The larvae feed on lichen on trees, both on conifers (Ochsenhemer) and on deciduous trees (Spuler). It can be obtained by beating saplings, bushes and grass. It is sometimes found feeding at flowers in the daytime.

Gallery

References

External links

Eilema sororcula at Fauna Europaea
"10499 Eilema sororcula (Hufnagel, 1766) - Dottergelbes Flechtenbärchen". Lepiforum e. V.

Moths described in 1766
Lithosiina
Moths of Europe
Moths of Asia
Taxa named by Johann Siegfried Hufnagel